Harald Grønningen (9 October 1934 – 26 August 2016) was a Norwegian cross-country skier who competed during the 1960s, earning five winter olympic and two world championship medals. He also won nine Norwegian championship titles and received the King's cup in 1963 and 1967. Grønningen won the 15 km twice (1960 and 1961) at the Holmenkollen ski festival and earned the Holmenkollen medal in 1961.

Grønningen was born in Lensvik. He was also an able long distance runner. His personal best times were 15:03.2 minutes in the 5000 metres, achieved in September 1963 at Trondheim stadion, and 31:04.6 minutes in the 10,000 metres, achieved in September 1961 at the same stadium. He represented the club Lensvik IL.

Cross-country skiing results
All results are sourced from the International Ski Federation (FIS).

Olympic Games
 5 medals – (2 gold, 3 silver)

World Championships
 4 medals – (1 gold, 1 silver, 2 bronze)

References

External links

Holmenkollen medalists - click Holmenkollmedaljen for downloadable pdf file 
Holmenkollen winners since 1892 - click Vinnere for downloadable pdf file 

1934 births
2016 deaths
Norwegian male cross-country skiers
Olympic cross-country skiers of Norway
Olympic medalists in cross-country skiing
Olympic gold medalists for Norway
Cross-country skiers at the 1960 Winter Olympics
Cross-country skiers at the 1964 Winter Olympics
Cross-country skiers at the 1968 Winter Olympics
Holmenkollen medalists
Holmenkollen Ski Festival winners
Norwegian male long-distance runners
FIS Nordic World Ski Championships medalists in cross-country skiing
Medalists at the 1960 Winter Olympics
Medalists at the 1964 Winter Olympics
Medalists at the 1968 Winter Olympics
Olympic silver medalists for Norway